York Street Public School is an elementary school JK-8 in the Lower Town neighbourhood of Ottawa, Canada.

History
York Street Public School is a large heritage school located in Lowertown, Ottawa in the Laurier/King Edward/Cobourg area.
The school was built in 1922 and designed by the architect W.C. Beattie.

The school celebrated its 75th anniversary in 1996 and its 90th the 2011–2012 school year. It replaced four smaller schools in the area: Robinson Primary, George Street, Rideau Street, and Bolton.

York Street Public School plays a prominent role in the books of children's author Brian Doyle, who is a graduate.

References

External links

Ottawa-Carleton District School Board
Report Card
York Street Public School

Elementary schools in Ottawa
Educational institutions established in 1922
1922 establishments in Ontario